Medici.tv (stylized as medici.tv), created in 2008, is a video streaming platform for classical music, jazz, and ballet.

Live events 
With 150+ live events each year, medici.tv live streams performances by various artists, ensembles and orchestras from concert halls, festivals and competitions, including Opéra national de Paris, Berliner Philharmoniker, London Symphony Orchestra, Mariinsky Theatre Symphony Orchestra, New York Philharmonic, Royal Concertgebouw Orchestra, Carnegie Hall, Bolshoi Theater, Glyndebourne Festival, Verbier Festival, Salzburg Festival, the International Tchaikovsky Competition, and the International Chopin Piano Competition among others.

The VOD catalog 
medici.tv has an extensive Video on Demand (VOD) catalog, with more than 3,000 videos of concerts, operas, ballets, jazz programs, classic archives, documentaries and master classes.

Featured on medici.tv 
Musicians and artists featured on medici.tv have included Martha Argerich, Daniel Barenboim, Khatia Buniatishvili, Natalie Dessay, Joyce DiDonato, Gustavo Dudamel, Renée Fleming, Valery Gergiev, Janine Jansen, Jonas Kaufmann, Evgeny Kissin, Lang Lang, Elisabeth Leonskaja, Riccardo Muti, Kent Nagano, Anna Netrebko, Yannick Nézet-Séguin, Gianandrea Noseda, Sir Simon Rattle, Anoushka Shankar, Yuri Temirkanov, Rolando Villazón, and Yuja Wang, as well as Claudio Abbado, Leonard Bernstein, Maria Callas, Glenn Gould, Nikolaus Harnoncourt, Herbert von Karajan, and Yehudi Menuhin.

Well-known jazz performers and the new generation of jazz musicians alike are featured, including Louis Armstrong, Chet Baker, BB King, James Brown, Ray Charles, John Coltrane, Chick Corea, Miles Davis, Duke Ellington, Bill Evans, Ella Fitzgerald, Dizzy Gillespie, Lionel Hampton, Herbie Hancock, Coleman Hawkins, Milt Jackson, Ahmad Jamal, Keith Jarrett, Quincy Jones, Wynton Marsalis, Thelonious Monk, Archie Shepp, Wayne Shorter, Nina Simone, Sarah Vaughan, Tony Allen, Ambrose Akinmusire, Kenny Barron, Avishai Cohen, Paquito, D'Rivera, Manu Dibango, Bill Frisell, Yaron Herman, Brad Mehldau, Marcus Miller, China Moses, Youssou Ndour, Michel Portal, Chris Potter, and Thomas Quasthoff.

Devices 
All of medici.tv's VOD catalogue and live events are available to watch on computer, tablet, phone, and TV via Apple TV and Chromecast.

Medici.tv is available in English, French, Spanish and Russian.

History 
After filming and broadcasting the Verbier Festival in 2007, the medici.tv video platform was officially launched on 1 May 2008 with 200 shows. This launch was followed by several live events– a concert of the New York Philharmonic, the classical music festival in Aspen and the Opera Festival in Aix-en-Provence– before the broadcast of the 2008 Verbier Festival.

In 2009, medici.tv won the 2008 Midem Classical Awards Internet Award.

In 2013, the medici.tv website recorded 1.5 million unique visitors. The same year, during the Verbier Festival concert's live-stream, the platform reached 750,000 connections from 177 countries.

At the end of 2014, medici.tv started broadcasting from Carnegie Hall. Four classical music concerts were streamed live, which marked the first time that Carnegie Hall concerts were filmed and broadcast on the internet, live and on replay. 

From June 15 to July 3, 2015, medici.tv broadcast the entire XV International Tchaikovsky Competition, one of the best-known classical music competitions. Over the four disciplines of the competition (piano, violin, cello and voice), 120 candidates were watched on the different stages of the competition in Moscow and St. Petersburg.

In 2017, medici.tv broadcast live Martha Argerich's return to Carnegie Hall after a 10-years absence.

For the 25th anniversary of the Verbier Festival in July 2018, medici.tv organized a celebration in which artists, presenters, and several speakers participated in an 8-hour long nonstop live-stream.

The website celebrated its tenth anniversary in 2018.

In May 2021, medici.tv added more than 300 jazz programs to the platform's VOD catalog.

References

External links 
 

Video hosting
French companies established in 2008
Online music stores of France
Internet properties established in 2008